Yarran is a small tree found in the eastern half of Australia.

Yarran may also refer to:

 Surname
 Shane Yarran
 Chris Yarran

 Plants
 Curly yarran
 Bastard yarran

 Places
 Yarran Dheran

See also 
 Yarranton